is a railway station on the Katsuyama Eiheiji Line in the town of Eiheiji, Fukui, Japan, operated by the private railway operator Echizen Railway.

Lines

Station layout
The station consists of one side platform and one island platform connected by a level crossing. The station is staffed. The original station building from 1914 has been preserved as a community centre.

Adjacent stations

History
On the Eiheiji Railway opened the Eiheijiguchi — Eiheijimon-Mae section, with through trains from Shin-Fukui to Eiheijimon-Mae operating from April 26, 1926. The station was renamed to its present name on January 1, 1927. On December 10, 1929 the Eiheiji Railway Kanazu (now ) — Eiheijiguchi section opened. On December 1, 1944 the line was transferred to the Keifuku Electric Railway and the station was renamed . The Kanazu to Higashi-Furuichi section was closed on September 18, 1969. On December 17, 2000, two trains collided  just east of the station due to a brake malfunction.

Operations were halted from June 25, 2001 due to a second accident. The spy line to Eiheiji was closed from October 21, 2001. The station was renamed back to its present name on October 21, 2001. The station reopened on July 20, 2003 as an Echizen Railway station. A new station building as completed on April 11, 2014

Surrounding area
This station is the closest to the Zen Buddhist temple Eihei-ji. Visitors transfer to Keifuku or Eiheiji community buses at the stop in front of the station.
Other points of interest include:
Eiheiji Town Hall, Eiheiji Branch Office

Kuzuryū River

See also
 List of railway stations in Japan

References

External links

  

Railway stations in Fukui Prefecture
Railway stations in Japan opened in 1914
Katsuyama Eiheiji Line
Eiheiji, Fukui